John Bridgeman is an American politician and real estate executive. He was a member of the North Carolina House of Representatives representing the 43rd District from 1999 to 2000.

Bridgeman, a member of the Democratic Party, was elected mayor of Gastoniain November 2011 with 45 percent of the vote. He was re-elected in 2015 and voted out in 2017.

References 

Living people
North Carolina Democrats
American real estate businesspeople
Mayors of places in North Carolina
Gardner–Webb University alumni
University of North Carolina at Charlotte alumni
Year of birth missing (living people)